Zintan ( Latin: Tentheos, Berber language: Zintan or Tigharmin or Tiɣaṛmin, meaning "small castles") is one of the biggest  cities in north western Libya, situated roughly  southwest of Tripoli, in the  area. The city and its surrounding area has a population of approximately 50,000.

History 
The Roman garrison town of Tentheos was on the Nafusa mountain range in the hinterland of the Limes Tripolitanus, near the border.

Libyan Civil War 2011
Groups from Zintan joined in the Libyan Civil War (2011). The Battle of Zintan reportedly began when the Gaddafi-led government forces arrived to recruit 1,000 soldiers. Insulted by the proposal to fight fellow Libyans, a group formed in Zintan to protest. As the group grew, pro-Gaddafi forces attacked but local groups counterattacked with seized weapons, "rout[ing]" a large, heavily armed government convoy on 19–20 March.

The Zintan people were responsible for the capture of Saif al-Islam, the second son of Muammar Gaddafi.

See also 
 Tripolitania – in this region
 Zintan Brigades

References

Populated places in Jabal al Gharbi District
Tripolitania
Baladiyat of Libya